Tegula felipensis is a species of sea snail, a marine gastropod mollusk in the family Tegulidae.

Description
The size of the shell varies between 14 mm and 17 mm.

Distribution
This marine species occurs off Baja California, Mexico.

References

External links
 To GenBank (2 nucleotides; 1 proteins)
 To USNM Invertebrate Zoology Mollusca Collection
 To World Register of Marine Species
 

felipensis
Gastropods described in 1970